Eric Mitchell (born 1992) is a Canadian ski jumper who has competed since 2008. At the 2010 Winter Olympics in Vancouver, he finished 12th in the team large hill, 49th in the individual normal hill, and 51st in the individual large hill events.

Mitchell's best career individual finish was 1st in an FIS Cup HS 106 event at Poland in 2011.

In 2013 he was the top Canadian at the National Championships in Whistler.

Mitchell officially came out as gay in a profile on the LGBT sports publication Outsports in 2015.

References

External links

1992 births
Canadian male ski jumpers
Living people
Olympic ski jumpers of Canada
Skiers from Calgary
Ski jumpers at the 2010 Winter Olympics
Canadian LGBT sportspeople
Gay sportsmen
LGBT skiers
LGBT ski jumpers
Canadian gay men